ATM Bersama is one of the interbank networks in Indonesia, connecting the ATM networks of twenty-one banks in Indonesia. It was established 1993 and is based on the model adopted by MegaLink, an interbank network in the Philippines.

ATM Bersama has over 70 members with 17,000 ATMs  throughout Indonesia. The network is owned by PT Artajasa Pembayaran Elektronis.

Services
ATM Bersama provides many interbank facilities, including balance inquiry, cash withdrawal and real time-online transfer to other accounts of members of the shared network. In 2004, ARTAJASA made a cross-border ATM Bersama with partner provider MEPS, Malaysia. Singapore and Thailand have been linked to the ATM Bersama network with NETS and ITMX respectively.

Members

The following banks are the members of ATM Bersama network:
ANZ
Bank Agroniaga
Bank Jago Tbk.
Bank Bengkulu 
Bank Bukopin
Bank Capital
Commonwealth Bank
Bank DKI
Bank Ganesha
Bank HSBC
Bank Ina Perdana
Bank Index
Bank Jabar Banten
Bank Jambi
Bank Jateng
Bank Jatim
Bank Kalbar
Bank Kalsel
Bank Kaltim
Bank Kesawan
Bank Kesejahteraan
Bank Lampung
Bank Maluku
Bank Mayapada Internasional
Bank Maybank Indonesia
Bank Mayora
Bank Mega
Bank Mega Syariah
Bank Mestika
Bank Muamalat
Bank Mutiara
Bank Nagari
Bank NTB
Bank NTT
Bank Nusantara Parahyangan
Bank Panin
Bank Papua
Bank Pundi Indonesia
Bank Riau Kepri
Bank Saudara
Bank Sinarmas
Bank Sulsel
Bank Sulteng
Bank Sultra
Bank SulutGo
Bank Sumsel Babel
Bank Sumut
Bank Swadesi
Bank Syariah Mandiri
Bank Negara Indonesia (BNI)
BPD Aceh
BPD Bali
BPD DIY
BPD Kalteng
BPR KS
BPR SJ
Bank Rakyat Indonesia (BRI)
BRI Syariah
BTN
BTPN
CIMB Niaga
Citibank
Bank Danamon
ICB Bumiputera
Bank Mandiri
OCBC NISP
Bank Permata
RBS
Standard Chartered
UOB Indonesia

See also
MegaLink
ATM usage fees

Indonesian interbank networks
ALTO
PRIMA
Link

References

External links
 ATM Bersama website
 PT Artajasa Pembayaran Elektronis website

Interbank networks
Financial services companies of Indonesia